Johannes Heimbeck (30 May 1892 – 24 September 1976) was a Norwegian physician and hospital director.

Biography
He was born in Kristiania (now Oslo), Norway.  He was the son of Louise Christopha Blom (1851–1938) and Johannes Marius Heimbeck (1848–1910). He graduated artium from Aars og Voss  skole  in 1910.  He became a cand.med. at the University of Oslo in 1917.

He received further education at Rikshospitalet and  Ullevål Hospital. He continued as assistant physician at the Oslo Health Council's Tuberculosis Department from 1931 to 1936. He chaired the Norwegian Red Cross Hospital in Oslo from 1936 to 1967. 
He is particularly known for introducing the BCG vaccination program against tuberculosis from 1926.

Heimbeck was a resistance pioneer, active during the first years of the occupation of Norway by Nazi Germany.

References

1892 births
1976 deaths
University of Oslo alumni
Oslo University Hospital people
Norwegian pulmonologists
Norwegian healthcare managers
Norwegian resistance members
20th-century Norwegian physicians